The French Consulate estimates there are over 25,000 French citizens in Hong Kong. The Immigration Department of Hong Kong estimated that 6,534 French nationals were in Hong Kong in 2019, an increase from 2,375 in 2009; the IMMD counts people physically present in Hong Kong because some people with Hong Kong permanent residency may have left the city.

It is the largest French community in Asia.

Education 
The French International School of Hong Kong operates multiple campuses in Hong Kong.

Famous ethnic French people
 Camille Cheng: Swimmer

See also

 France–Hong Kong relations
 Le French May
 Former French Mission Building
 Béthanie (Hong Kong)

References 

French diaspora in Asia
 
European diaspora in Hong Kong